Graeme McCracken (born 23 July 1986 in Coatbridge) is a Scottish former footballer who played as a midfielder.

Career

McCracken started his career with Clyde, being on a YTS contract between 2002 and 2004, before signing his first professional contract in July 2004. He made his senior debut in a Scottish Challenge Cup match against Stranraer in August 2004. He only made a couple more appearances after this, and was loaned to local junior outfit Cumbernauld United in January 2005.

He was released by Clyde in May 2005, and joined Cumbernauld permanently. He spent a season there, before joining Cambuslang Rangers for the 2006–07 season. He then joined an amateur club in Coatbridge called Burnbank Amateurs F.C. Who Former St. Johnstone and Albion Rovers Player Robert Greenock used to play for.

See also
2004–05 Clyde F.C. season

References

External links

1986 births
Living people
Footballers from Coatbridge
Scottish footballers
Association football midfielders
Clyde F.C. players
Cambuslang Rangers F.C. players
Cumbernauld United F.C. players
Scottish Football League players
Scottish Junior Football Association players